Zharabad (also Romanized as Zhārābād) is a village in Margavar Rural District, Silvaneh District, Urmia County, West Azerbaijan Province, Iran. At the 2006 census, its population was 1,017, in 164 families.

References 

Populated places in Urmia County